Nikita Aleksandrovich Kurbanov (born October 5, 1986) is a Russian professional basketball player and the team captain of CSKA Moscow of the VTB United League.

Professional career
Kurbanov made his professional debut with CSKA Moscow during the 2004–05 season. He then moved to Lokomotiv Rostov, before returning to CSKA Moscow. He joined UNICS Kazan in 2008, and he spent the 2008–09 season with Spartak St. Petersburg. He then moved back to CSKA Moscow once again. On June 17, 2014, he signed a 1+1 deal with Lokomotiv Kuban.

On June 15, 2015, he signed a two-year contract with the option of third year with his former team CSKA Moscow. On May 5, 2017, Kurbanov was named VTB United League Defensive Player of the Year of the 2016–17 season. On June 18, 2021, Kurbanov extended his contract for another two (1+1) years.

Russian national team
As a member of the junior Russian national basketball teams, Kurbanov led the 2004 FIBA Europe Under-18 Championship in scoring and he was named to the competition's All-Tournament First Team. He also won the gold medal with Russia's junior national team at the 2005 FIBA Europe Under-20 Championship. He was also named the tournament's MVP.

He has also played with the senior Russian national basketball team at the EuroBasket 2009, the EuroBasket 2015, and the EuroBasket 2017.

Career statistics

EuroLeague

|-
| style="text-align:left;"| 2005–06
| style="text-align:left;" rowspan=13| CSKA Moscow
| 17 || 0 || 9.0 || .421 || .200 || .706 || 1.6 || .3 || .5 || .3 || 2 || 1.6
|-
| style="text-align:left;"| 2006–07
| 15 || 4 || 7.2 || .500 || .333 || .636 || 1.5 || .3 || .2 || .1 || 2.1 || 1.4
|-
| style="text-align:left;background:#AFE6BA;"| 2007–08†
| 3 || 0 || 8.1 || 1.000 || .500 || 1.000 || 1.7 || .0 || .7 || .0 || 3.7 || 4.3
|-
| style="text-align:left;"| 2009–10
| 18 || 0 || 6.5 || .313 || .375 || .500 || 1.2 || 0.4 || .2 || .0 || 1.1 || 1.1
|-
| style="text-align:left;"| 2010–11
| 7 || 0 || 5.4 || 1.000 || .0 || 1.000 || 1.0 || 0.3 || 0.3 || .0 || 1.4 || 1.7
|-
| style="text-align:left;"| 2011–12
| 6 || 0 || 10.5 || .471 || .333 || 1.000 || 2.5 || 0.3 || 1.0 || .3 || 3.8 || 4.7
|-
| style="text-align:left;background:#AFE6BA;"| 2015–16†
| 29 || 15 || 20.0 || .558 || .413 || .889 || 5.0 || 1.2 || 0.7 || .1 || 6.7 || 10.2
|-
| style="text-align:left;"| 2016–17
| 35 || 29 || 19.1 || .489 || .333 || .894 || 3.8 || 1.1 || 0.6 || .3 || 6.1 || 7.6
|-
| style="text-align:left;"| 2017–18
| 36 || 35 || 18.3 || .542 || .333 || .863 || 3.2 || 1.3 || 0.7 || .2 || 5.2 || 6.4
|-
| style="text-align:left;background:#AFE6BA;"| 2018–19†
| 34 || 28 || 17.4 || .661 || .511 || .833 || 3.5 || 0.8 || 0.5 || .1 || 5.7 || 7.8
|-
| style="text-align:left;"| 2019–20
| 28 || 28 || 20.1 || .489 || .444 || .792 || 3.5 || 1.5 || 0.6 || .3 || 5.3 || 6.8
|-
| style="text-align:left;"| 2020–21
| 39 || 39 || 22.0 || .620 || .338 || .718 || 2.6 || 0.9 || 0.6 || .3 || 4.1 || 4.8
|-
| style="text-align:left;"| 2021–22
| 18 || 18 || 18.3 || .652 || .387 || .667 || 2.3 || 0.8 || 0.2 || .2 || 4.0 || 4.5

References

External links

Nikita Kurbanov at eurobasket.net
Nikita Kurbanov at euroleague.net
Nikita Kurbanov at fiba.com

1986 births
Living people
BC Spartak Saint Petersburg players
BC UNICS players
PBC CSKA Moscow players
PBC Lokomotiv-Kuban players
Russian men's basketball players
Small forwards
Basketball players from Moscow
2019 FIBA Basketball World Cup players